Justice Keith may refer to:

Brian Keith (judge) (born 1944), justice of the High Court of England and Wales
James Keith (Virginia judge) (1839–1918), associate justice of the Virginia Supreme Court of Appeals
Sandy Keith (1928–2020), chief justice of the Minnesota Supreme Court